Letsie II Lerotholi (Letsienyane) (1867–1913), paramount chief of Basuto (later Lesotho) from 1905–1913. Letsienyane was the son of Lerotholi. He became the ruler upon the death  of Lerotholi in 1905, but took little interest in government. He was succeeded by his brother, Nathaniel Griffith Lerotholi.

References

1867 births
1913 deaths
House of Moshesh
Basutoland people